CZJ may refer to:

 Catherine Zeta-Jones (born 1969), Welsh actress
 FC Carl Zeiss Jena, German football club
 Carl Zeiss Jena (company), German optics company